The 2013 Judo Grand Slam Moscow was held in Moscow, Russia, from 20 to 21 July 2013.

Medal summary

Men's events

Women's events

Source Results

Medal table

References

External links
 

2013 IJF World Tour
2013 Judo Grand Slam
Judo
Judo competitions in Russia
Judo
Judo